Abdellaoui is a surname. Notable people with the surname include:

 Ayoub Abdellaoui (born 1993), Algerian footballer
 Cherine Abdellaoui (born 1998), Algerian judoka
 Samir Abdellaoui (born 1980), Tunisian politician
 Yassine Abdellaoui (born 1975), Dutch footballer